Foreign territories in Singapore are the plots of land owned by other countries in the Republic of Singapore. There are currently only two separate pieces of land in the country which fall under this category, both of which are owned by Malaysia and fall under its extraterritorial jurisdiction. The foreign territories in Singapore do not include diplomatic missions, like embassies and high commissions operated by other countries in the republic, because contrary to popular belief, diplomatic missions do not exercise full sovereign rights of the respective countries but only enjoy certain immunity of local laws. Several other Singapore rules and laws still apply in these areas, and Singapore reserves full rights to suspend or expel diplomatic missions in the country without compensation.

Foreign territories
There are currently two plots of land owned by Malaysia, more explicitly by the state of Johor for the Sultan of Johor. Both pieces of land are in the possession of Malaysia due to historical circumstances that pre-date Singapore's independence. Despite it being under the jurisdiction of Malaysia, access to the location is not controlled, and there are no immigration or customs checks to enter or exit these territories. As such, although these territories are completely surrounded by Singapore land, they are rarely considered to be enclaves of Malaysia. There have been no disputes over these territories by either country, nor have there been legal complications that have arisen from this unusual situation.

Masjid Temenggong Daeng Ibrahim
Masjid Temenggong Daeng Ibrahim sits on an approximately 1.2 ha piece of land in Telok Blangah where there was formerly a palace, Istana Lama, for Temenggong Abdul Rahman, the Temenggong of Johor. The property was first awarded to the Temenggong in 1823 by the British when the Temenggong and his followers were relocated from Kampong Glam. The Temenggong died at the palace in 1825. The audience hall was built nearby at an unknown year. It was later converted to a mosque, although the adjacent plot of land remains a Muslim cemetery that continues to hold the royal tomb of Temenggong Abdul Rahman and Temenggong Daeng Ibrahim. The land was then passed down to Temenggong Abu Bakar, who later moved his residence to Tyersall; the palace was demolished soon afterwards. The land parcel continues to be held by the Sultan of Johor, and there are no plans by the Singapore authorities to acquire the land, despite its close proximity to the Central Business District and also the former KTM Tanjong Pagar railway station. It is one of two mosques in Singapore not governed under Majlis Ugama Islam Singapura, the central governing body of Islamic affairs in Singapore.

Istana Tyersall and Istana Woodneuk
A 24.4 ha piece of land beside the Singapore Botanic Gardens was formerly the site of both Istanas for the Sultan of Johor and his wives. It was acquired by Sultan Abu Bakar in 1857 from prominent newspaper editor and lawyer William Napier and has been passed down for generations since then. It still remains a property of the Sultan of Johor. Istana Tyersall has since been demolished, while Istana Woodneuk still stands in a dilapidated condition, due to lack of maintenance. The Istana and the surrounding compounds have been cordoned off in view of safety, and access is restricted. There are no plans by the Singapore authorities to acquire the land, despite it sitting on large areas of prime land and also being in proximity to a section of the former KTM railway tracks in Buona Vista.

Joint operation ventures
There are multiple pieces of land in Singapore that are currently under the joint management of both Singapore and another country. Many of these have arisen due to land swap deals between Singapore and Malaysia in the past, most notably during the Keretapi Tanah Melayu (KTM) railway land swap deal in 2010. However, there are several that are joint ventures between Singapore and Malaysia as a result of bilateral cooperation between the two countries in developing enhanced border crossing facilities.

KTM Railway land swap
The iconic DUO and Marina One buildings were built by M+S Pte Ltd, in which Malaysia's Khazanah Nasional has a 60 per cent stake, and Singapore's Temasek Holdings, a 40 per cent one. Malaysia was not required as ruled by the Permanent Court of Arbitration at The Hague to pay land developmental charges amounting to $1.4 billion for land parcels, even though Singapore initially insisted. Malaysia was not required to pay because these lands were at the newer sites, but the older site became a Rail Corridor and a main cycling route instead of overhead railway tracks and multiple fencing.

Changi Ferry Terminal
The Changi Ferry Terminal is the only ferry terminal in Singapore under the management of the Johor Port Authority (JPA) instead of the Maritime and Port Authority of Singapore. It was opened in 1993 and was leased to JPA for operations, as agreed prior to its opening. The ferry terminal was intended to boost border crossing capabilities between the two countries, although it currently only serves one destination in Tanjung Belungkor, Johor, which is near Desaru. There currently have been no requests made by the Johor authorities to raise the frequency of service or increase the number of ports served by the ferry terminal.

Cross-border MRT
The Johor Bahru–Singapore Rapid Transit System between Singapore and Malaysia is a joint venture between the two countries and each country maintains the segment of the railway that runs in their country. The MRT is expected to run between Bukit Chagar in Malaysia and Woodlands North in Singapore, where passengers can transfer to the Thomson-East Coast MRT Line to head to the city. Currently the MRT is slated to be operated by both SMRT Trains (Singapore) and Prasarana Malaysia, with these companies setting the fares as well. It was agreed due to costs factor that the maintenance of the MRT would be primarily done in Singapore and the trains themselves would be similar to the ones used by the Thomson-East Coast Line. Immigration and customs would also be co-located in the country of departure to enhance the flow of passengers. The joint tender for construction for the project has yet to be awarded by both countries.

High-speed railway
The Kuala Lumpur–Singapore high-speed rail (HSR) between Singapore and Malaysia is another joint venture between the two countries and each country maintains the segment of the railway that runs in their country. The HSR is expected to run from Kuala Lumpur in Malaysia to Jurong East in Singapore, with a few stations in between. There are expected to be three train services, of which two, the cross border shuttle service and the Kuala Lumpur-Singapore service, are expected to run into Singapore. The operators for the HSR would be SG HSR (Singapore) and MyHSR (Malaysia). Immigration and customs would also be co-located in the country of departure to enhance the flow of passengers. The joint tender for construction of the project has yet to be awarded by both countries, and the splitting of the cost of operation and profit shared between them have also yet to be decided.

Historical foreign territories

Bidadari
Bidadari was once used by the Sultan Abu Bakar of Johor as its Istana Bidadari. However, it was reacquired by the British to be used as a cemetery in late 1903. Since Singapore's independence it has been under Singapore's jurisdiction. There have been no claims made by Malaysia over this area.

Malaysia KTM Land
The Malaysia KTM railway once cut through 20 to 30 km of Singaporean land from Woodlands to Tanjong Pagar. This approximately 220 ha piece of land on which the railway sits on was awarded by the British to the then Federated Malay States Railways in 1918 on a 999 year lease, with a covenant that restricts its use solely for the railway. In 1983, the Singapore government assumed the responsibility of the land under KTM (Singapore) Act 1984, to allow double tracking and electrification across the KTM route. Singapore Prime Minister Lee Kuan Yew and Finance Minister of Malaysia Tun Daim Zanuddin later agreed in the Malaysia–Singapore Points of Agreement of 1990 to do away with the covenant and to settle the matter, because Singapore has more developments in the vicinity. However the implementation of the point of agreement reached had been slow and plagued with inconsistencies within 20 years, with the Concept Plan 2001 having more MRT lines that goes along Bukit Timah-Sungei Kadut corridor. In 2010, Singapore Prime Minister Lee Hsien Loong and his Malaysian counterpart Najib Razak finally agreed upon and finalised the interpretation of the 1990 agreement, paving the way for the eventual land swap deal that saw KTM railway operations shortened to Woodlands Train Checkpoint, with some sections being distributed to Downtown MRT Line, as well as service 61, 170 and the Ayer Rajah Expressway. Today the KTM railway up to the Singapore-Malaysia border belongs to Singapore as accorded in the 2010 deal between both countries. The station and facilities in Woodlands Train Checkpoint also belongs to Singapore, although KTM continues to be able to station its Malaysian staff at the railway premises. Immigration and customs control are also co-located at the Woodlands Train Checkpoint, thus ending years of peculiar immigration clearance by train passengers.

UK military training area
There are several plots of land that the British continued to have partial jurisdiction over after the merger of Singapore with Malaysia in 1963 and then subsequently the independence of Singapore in 1965. These plots of land were primarily used for military training and to house the servicemen and their families. These were Sembawang Naval Base, RAF bases located in Changi, Seletar and Tengah, and command buildings in Pasir Panjang and Tanglin. After the British withdrew in 1971, due to the East of Suez policy, most of these land plots were returned to Singapore, although several were handed over to the ANZUK troops left in its wake, due to the Five Power Defence Arrangements of 1971.

The exact nature of British jurisdiction was not exactly known due to the conflict in the status of forces agreement section within the 1957 Anglo-Malayan Defence Agreement, which indicated that the United Kingdom had complete control over the area and its usage, as long as it was to be deemed necessary militarily, and Malaysian Prime Minister subsequent comments on the matter:

 "... subject to the proviso that the Government of Malaysia will afford to the Government of the United Kingdom the right to continue to maintain the bases and other facilities at present occupied by their service authorities within the State of Singapore and will permit the United Kingdom to make such use of these bases and facilities as the United Kingdom may consider necessary for the purpose of assisting in the defence of Malaysia, and for Commonwealth defence and for the preservation of peace in Southeast Asia."  1957 Anglo-Malayan Defence Agreement  

 "... although Singapore could not be regarded as a SEATO (South East Asia Treaty Organisation) base, it could be used for SEATO purposes if Britain considered this necessary for the maintenance of security in South-East Asa. In every case, however, the future Malaysian Government would be consulted about the use of the base."  Prime Minister Tunku Abdul Rahman

ANZUK military training area
There are several plots of land that the ANZUK nations have partial jurisdiction over in the wake of the 1971 British troops withdrawal from Singapore and the Five Power Defence Arrangements. These plots of land were similarly used for military training and to house the servicemen and their families. They were handed over in phases to the government of Singapore when the troops started to completely withdraw from the region, with the Australians starting to pull out first, then the British and finally the New Zealand Force South East Asia withdrew in 1989. This resulted in bases in Changi, Seletar, Tengah, Nee Soon Garrison, Dieppe Barracks and finally Sembawang Naval Base being handed over chronologically to Singapore. Several of the aforementioned military bases continue to be used by the five nations in the Five Power Defence Arrangements, although jurisdiction over the area now solely belongs to Singapore.

Malaysia military training area
There are several plots of land that Malaysia continued to have partial jurisdiction over after the independence of Singapore. These plots of land were similarly used for military training and to house the servicemen. The troops were stationed at first at Fort Canning, before moving to Khatib Camp, and finally withdrawn after Malaysia decided to do so on their own accord. Meanwhile the Royal Malaysian Navy Base in Sembawang Naval Base was used as headquarters of the Malaysian Navy till the early 1990s.

See also
 Foreign territories of Singapore
 List of diplomatic missions in Singapore
 Foreign relations of Singapore
 Indonesia–Singapore border
 Malaysia–Singapore border

References

Geography of Singapore